The following countries have or had comprehensive prohibitions against alcohol. Particularly the term refers to the banning of the manufacture, storage (whether in barrels or in bottles), transportation, sale, possession, and consumption of alcoholic beverages.

Present
Currently, alcohol prohibition is enforced in many Muslim majority countries,  Indigenous Australian communities (due to alcohol-fuelled violence), certain northern communities in the Canadian territories and some regions of India. They can range from complete ban all the way to bans on sales during certain times.

 (illegal in public, legal in restaurants, bars, hotels and homes)
 (legal for non-Muslims and foreigners)
 (Non-Muslims over 17 years of age may have limited amount of alcohol, but must declare it to the customs authorities on arrival, and must consume it in private)
 
 (in some communities)
 (in some communities)
 (in some communities)
 (in some communities)
 (for Muslims during Ramadan)

 illegal to drink in public place and during Ramadan.
 

 ( territory only)
 (home production legal for Zoroastrians, Jews and Christians; commercial production illegal)
 (parliamentary ban, rarely enforced)
 (between 11 p.m. to 6 a.m.,)

 (legal for Foreigners at licensed establishments; transport of alcohol illegal)

 (Alcohol must be purchased and consumed in licensed hotels, bars, and tourist areas as well as being sold in most major supermarkets)
 (legal for non-Muslim foreigners at restaurants, hotels and bars; at home with license; illegal in public)
 (illegal for Muslims; public consumption illegal)
 (De facto illegal in the Hamas-controlled Gaza Strip only, legal in the West Bank)
 (legal for tourists at hotels and bars as well as expatriates with permits)

 (excluding non-Muslims in private)
 (sales only banned on Fridays and during Ramadan)
 (illegal on trains, airplanes, and ferries as well as sports facilities; sales banned on weekends and holidays unless at bars and restaurants)
 (illegal, before the war, there was exceptions for tourists at certain hotels in Aden and Sana'a)
 (illegal in Sharjah; public consumption illegal)

Past

1918–1920 (see prohibition in Canada)
1907–1992 (see 1907 Faroese alcohol referendum)
1919–1932
March 21August 1, 1919Sale and consumption of alcohol was prohibited (partial ban from July 23).
1915–1935 (see prohibition in Iceland)However beer with an alcohol content exceeding 2.25% was prohibited until 1989.
1962–1990
1916–1926, distilled spirits banned; 1917-1923 fortified wines banned. 
1612–1640 (prohibition by Murad IV)
March 25May 8, 2020Sale and consumption of alcohol was prohibited as part of the social distancing measures against Covid-19.
 1966–1986
 1790-2009
 and the July 19, 1914 – August 28, 1925; 1929;
 (temporary ban to prevent drunken violence during the COVID-19 pandemic in South Africa)
 – In November 2020, the UAE introduced reforms that include the decriminalisation of alcohol for those 21 and over, except the Emirate of Sharjah.

1920–1933 (see prohibition in the United States)

See also
 Religion and alcohol

Notes

References

Alcohol prohibition
Alcohol prohibition, countries